West Meadows is a neighborhood located in the New Tampa district of Tampa, Florida. The estimated population stands at 2,381.

Geography
West Meadows is located at latitude 28.148 north and longitude 82.382 west. The elevation is 46 feet above sea level. Interbay is bordered by Bruce B. Downs Boulevard to the east and much of Interstate 75 to the west.

Demographics
The median income for the neighborhood is $67,183, which is above citywide average.

In the neighborhood the population was spread out, with 26.9% under the age of 20, 42.8% from 20 to 39, 24.3% from 40 to 59, and 6.1% who were 60 years of age or older.

Education
West Meadows  is served by Hillsborough County Public Schools, which serves the city of Tampa and Hillsborough County. Clark Elementary is located within the neighborhood.

See also
New Tampa
Neighborhoods in Tampa, Florida

References

External links
Official website
West Meadows Local Community

Neighborhoods in Tampa, Florida